Ann Mukoro  (born 27 May 1975) is a Nigerian footballer who played as a midfielder for the Nigeria women's national football team. She was part of the team at the inaugural 1991 FIFA Women's World Cup as well as the 1995 FIFA Women's World Cup.

References

External links
 

1975 births
Living people
Nigerian women's footballers
Nigeria women's international footballers
Place of birth missing (living people)
1995 FIFA Women's World Cup players
Women's association football midfielders
1991 FIFA Women's World Cup players